Augusto Matine (13 February 1947 – 13 October 2020) was a Portuguese footballer and manager who played as a midfielder mostly for Benfica and Vitória de Setúbal at club level and nine times for the Portugal national team. Most notably, he managed the Mozambique national team.

Club career
Born in Lourenço Marques (now Maputo), Matine, a midfielder, joined Benfica in Lisbon from Central de Lourenço Marques in 1967. After playing two seasons for Benfica's main squad, with whom he won the 1969–70 Taça de Portugal and the 1970–71 Primeira Divisão, he spent one year on loan at Vitória de Setúbal. He returned to Benfica the next season and won the 1972–73 Primeira Divisão and the Taça de Honra before leaving permanently to Vitória de Setúbal, where he would play from 1973 to 1976. He then represented Portimonense, Lusitano de Évora and Desportivo das Aves for a season each, and lastly Estrela da Amadora and Torralta for two seasons each.

International career
Internationally, Matine gained nine caps for Portugal. He made his debut on 10 May 1970 in Lisbon against Italy, in a 1–2 defeat, and played his last match for the country in 1973.

Manager career
After retiring as a player in 1986, Matine became a football manager. He was an assistant coach and scout for Estrela da Amadora and later managed the Mozambique national team from 2001 to 2002. Moreover, he was appointed manager of home town clubs Ferroviário de Maputo, in 2003, and Desportivo de Maputo, until May 2012.

Death
Matine died in Maputo on 13 October 2020, aged 73.

Honours
Benfica
Primeira Liga: 1970–71, 1972–73
Taça de Portugal: 1969–70
Taça de Honra: 1972–73

References

External links

1947 births
2020 deaths
Sportspeople from Maputo
Portuguese footballers
Association football midfielders
Primeira Liga players
S.L. Benfica footballers
Vitória F.C. players
Portimonense S.C. players
C.D. Aves players
C.F. Estrela da Amadora players
Portugal international footballers
Mozambique national football team managers
Portuguese football managers